Milan Peric (born 24 July 1957) is a Czech expressionist painter, bass player and avant-garde musician, lecturer of art in Academy of Fine Arts in Prague and member of Czechoslovak underground culture of the 1980s.

Biography 

1986‑1987 Academy of Fine Arts in Prague, landscape paintings prof. Jiří Karmazín
1990‑1993 Academy of Fine Arts in Prague, intermedia studio (prof. Milan Knížák)
Since 1995 working as a teaching assistant in intermedia studio in Academy of Fine Arts in Prague

His works 
Peric exhibited in Denmark, the Netherlands, Austria, Germany and USA. During the 10 and 12 October in the year 1986 was managed group exhibition Confrontation V. by Czechoslovak "underground" that's mean "non-official action" at the Milan Peric's farm "Svarov" close Kladno.

Artist portraits 
A portfolio of all his black and white portraits was prepared by Miroslav Pesch and a limited number of these portraits were prepared by as large-format prints. The final edition, based on Peric's specifications, will be realized under the title Happy people.

Solo exhibition 

2007 Happy people, Galerie XXL Louny*2005–2006 Petr Písařík, Milan Peric, The National Gallery in Prague

Group exhibitions 

1986 Konfrontace V. Svárov, Kladno, Czechoslovakia*1987 Konfrontace VI. Prague
Konfrontace VII. in Svárov village close Kladno
1989 Konfrontace VIII. Svárov
Dům u kamenného zvonu, Prague
1990 Gallery of Špála (Špálova galerie) Prague
Vodní tvrz Praha /skupina Svárov /
De Fabriek Eindhoven – Netherlands
Open Haven Muzeum Amsterdam – Netherlands
1991 / La peniche Opera Prague
1992 Karolinum Praha /skupina Svárov/
The National Gallery of Art in Bratislava, Slovakia
1993 Konfrontace IX. Svárov
Karolinum in Prague, Czech Republic
IAA Frankfurt am Main – Germany
1994 Kunstpalast Düsseldorf
"Netz Europe" Linz, Austria

Collections 

National Gallery Prague
The Czech Museum of Fine Arts in Prague 
Private collection in Czech Republic, Germany, Canada, Switzerland and Sweden.

References

External links and materials 
 about happening in Svarov 1986
 Petr Písařík – Milan Perič exhibition in The National Gallery in Prague
  Academy of Fine Arts in Prague
 
  Undergroundculture
  Milan Peric and Grand Sculpturefestival in Prague
  Videoreports with Milan Perič on Artycok.TV

Literature for study 
 Milan Peric Biography
 catalogue Milan Peric
 Czechoslovak underground literature:  Někdo něco no.5 and no.6

Articles 
  Svarov action 1986

1957 births
Photographers from Prague
Artists from Prague
Living people
Academic staff of the Academy of Fine Arts, Prague
Academy of Fine Arts, Prague alumni
Musicians from Prague